HMS Rochfort was a 74-gun third rate ship of the line of the Royal Navy, launched on 6 August 1814 at Milford Haven. She was designed by the French émigré Jean-Louis Barrallier, and was the only ship built to her draught. A second ship, Sandwich, was cancelled in 1811 before construction could be completed.

Lloyd's List reported in May 1817 that the Revenue cutter stork and Rocheforts tender "Cornelian" had recaptured the ship Catherina, of and from Hamburg for Lisbon, and the galiot Catherina, of Oldenborg from Antwerp for Havre, which a  schooner had captured on 27 May. The British also captured the schooner and brought all three vessels into Dover.

Fate
Rochfort was broken up in 1826.

Citations

References

Lavery, Brian (2003) The Ship of the Line - Volume 1: The development of the battlefleet 1650-1850. Conway Maritime Press. .
 

Ships of the line of the Royal Navy
1814 ships